Ardiana Hobdari was the Albanian Ambassador to Greece until she was dismissed in March 2019.

References

Albanian women ambassadors
Living people
Albanian women diplomats
Ambassadors of Albania to Greece
Year of birth missing (living people)